Silvie Paladino (born 18 August 1971) is an Australian singer. She began singing at the age of nine, learning at an inner-Melbourne music school, and from an early age won several major singing competitions, including the Italian Song Festival and the grand final of Channel Ten's Young Talent Time.

Career
During 1989, Paladino was offered the role of Eponine in Les Misérables as an eighteen-year-old. She was nominated for Best Supporting Actress in the 1991 Melbourne Green Room Award for her performance. Paladino continued performing the role for a further twelve months touring Australia and New Zealand to critical acclaim. She received the same recognition in 1992 when she accepted an invitation to perform the role of Eponine on the West End in the London production of Les Misérables. In 1997, Paladino was invited to return to London where she performed the role of Fantine in Les Misérables for two years.

Paladino's other Australasian credits include the role of Jeannie in the Australian tour of Hair, the role of Grizabella in the Australian and Asian tour of Cats and since then has recreated the role in both Sydney and Kuala Lumpur. In 1995 Silvie appeared as Ellen in Cameron Mackintosh's Australian premiere of Miss Saigon at Sydney's Capitol Theatre. For this role she received a nomination for Best Supporting Artist in the Mo Awards.

In 2001, Paladino toured with her one-woman show Silvie Paladino Sings Streisand, and was nominated for a Green Room Award. She released a live CD of this performance.

Silvie played the lead role of Donna in the smash hit Mamma Mia! throughout Australia and Asia.

In 2007, Paladino played the leading role of Rita in the world premiere of Sideshow Alley for McPherson Ink, for which she was nominated for a Helpmann Award for Best Female Actor in a Musical.

Paladino signed a recording deal with Universal Music Australia and released a Christmas album, Christmas List on 24 November 2007, which features songs from her performances at previous Carols by Candlelight.

For The Production Company in Melbourne, Paladino's roles include Lady Thiang in The King and I in 2010, Florency Vassey in Chess directed by Gale Edwards in 2012, and Jerry's Girls in 2015.

Apart from her theatrical credits, she is well known to Australian audiences through her regular appearances on Good Morning Australia, Denise, The Midday Show, In Melbourne Tonight, and Hey Hey It's Saturday. Silvie is also a regular performer at Carols by Candlelight at the Sidney Myer Music Bowl, and has featured at many special events such as the worldwide telecast of the National Rugby League (NRL) Grand Final in Sydney, the 2005 Australian Football League Grand Final in Melbourne with the national anthem "Advance Australia Fair", and the V8 Supercar Championships at Phillip Island.

Silvie's concert performances include lead artist with Melbourne Symphony Orchestra, Sydney Symphony, West Australian Symphony Orchestra, Melbourne Opera, Australian Philharmonic Orchestra, State Orchestra of Victoria and Tasmanian Symphony Orchestra. She has toured with Bangkok Symphony Orchestra in a series of concerts in Thailand. Paladino completed a national tour as a special guest star with international crooner Patrizio Buanne.

In 2022 she was in a production of Cinderella.

Silvie is married to Brett Hinch. They have been in a relationship since 2015 and married in 2019.

Awards

References

External links
Official website

1971 births
Australian women singers
Australian musical theatre actresses
Living people
Singers from Melbourne
Australian sopranos
Australian Christians
Australian performers of Christian music